Hanna van Vliet (born 6 June 1992 in Gorinchem) is a Dutch actress. She broke through to an international audience when she played the role of Anne Verbeek in the Anne+ productions. In 2022 she received the Shooting Stars Award at the Berlinale as one of the ten most promising European film actors.

Biography 
Van Vliet started acting at the age of six and played her entire youth at Het Jeugdtheaterhuis Gouda. In 2014 she graduated from the Amsterdam Theater & Kleinkunstacademie. In 2014 she played the lead role in a Pippi Longstocking musical and in 2015 she played the lead role in a musical based on the book The Twins., for which she received a Musical Award nomination for best female lead in a major musical. In 2018, she was nominated again for a Musical Award for Best Supporting Actor for her role in Fiddler on the Roof.
In 2017 she appeared on the silver screen with the role of Winnie in the film Ron Goossens, Low Budget Stuntman.

From the beginning of 2017, Van Vliet was closely involved in the development of the Anne+ series, in which she plays the title role. The series premiered at the Netherlands Film Festival at the end of 2018 and had a second season which started on Tuesday, March 3, 2020, and from March 2021 is featured on streaming platform Netflix. Anne+ received a sequel in 2021 in the form of a feature film with a cinema release in the Netherlands and Belgium, and afterwards a release worldwide on Netflix. In 2020 Van Vliet was nominated for a Golden Calf for Best Actress in Television Drama at the Netherlands Film Festival for her role as Anne in the series. Since September 2020, Van Vliet has played the role of Gwen Winter in the television series SpangaS. In 2022 she was won the Shooting Stars Award at the Berlinale as one of the 10 most promising European young talents.

Filmography

Film

Television

Theatre 
Van Vliet played in the following theatre plays:

References

External links 
 
 Official webpage of Anne+

21st-century Dutch actresses
Dutch film actresses
Dutch stage actresses
Dutch television actresses
Golden Calf winners
Living people
1992 births
Dutch LGBT actors